Macrocarpaea thamnoides is a species of plant in the family Gentianaceae. It is endemic to Jamaica.  It is threatened by habitat loss.

References

thamnoides
Vulnerable plants
Endemic flora of Jamaica
Taxonomy articles created by Polbot